Jesse Hartman is an American musician, film maker and actor, living in New York's East Village.

Hartman formed Sammy with Luke Wood (where Hartman co-wrote, sang, and played guitar and keyboards), releasing Debut Album (1994), Kings of the Inland Empire (1995) and Tales of Great Neck Glory (1996).

He then went on to form the rock/electro group Laptop in 1997, releasing an EP, End Credits, in 1997, followed by the single "Gimme The Nite" in 1998. "End Credits" garnered airplay on BBC Radio 1's Evening Session. The song used samples of Hartman's ex-girlfriend's answering machine. The Laptop single Nothing to Declare spent one week at #74 in the UK Singles Chart in June 1999.

Hartman was then signed to a recording contract by Island Records and released two singles ("Nothing to Declare" and "I'm So Happy You Failed", both in 1999), before leaving the label. He eventually joined Trust Me Records and released the albums Opening Credits (2000), The Old Me vs. The New You (2001), and Don't Try This At Home (2003).

As a filmmaker, Hartman has written and directed Happy Hour (1993, Best Short Film Award Berlin Intl. Film Festival), made documentaries for MSNBC's Edgewise (1997, opening night selection of Rotterdam Intl. Film Festival), and co-produced Kelly Reichardt's indie hit feature River Of Grass.

As an actor, Hartman has been in Larry Fessenden's vampire film Habit.

References

External links
Laptop official website
Trust Me Records: Laptop

Living people
Year of birth missing (living people)
American male actors
American rock guitarists
American male guitarists
American rock keyboardists
American electronic musicians
People from the East Village, Manhattan